Elections are held in Providence, Rhode Island to elect the city's mayor. Such elections are regularly scheduled to be held in United States midterm election years.

Elections before 1998

1998
 

The 1998 Providence, Rhode Island mayoral election was held on November 3, 1998. It saw the reelection of Buddy Cianci to sixth overall, and third consecutive, term. Cianci ran unchallenged.

2002
 

The 2002 Providence, Rhode Island mayoral election was held on November 5, 2002. It saw the election of Democratic nominee David Cicilline in a landslide victory.

Cicilline was openly gay. After Cicilline took office, Providence became largest city in the United States at the time to have had an openly LGBTQ mayor (a distinction which had, beforehand, belonged to Tempe, Arizona since its election of Neil Giuliano).

Democratic primary
The Democratic Party held its primary election on September 10, 2002.

Candidates
David Cicilline, member of the Rhode Island House of Representatives since 1995
Joseph R. Paolino Jr., former mayor of Providence (1984–1991) and former United States ambassador to Malta (1994–1996)
David V. Igliozzi, Rhode Island state senator and former Providence city councilor
Kevin McKenna, attorney

Withdrew
Thomas O'Connor

Polls

Campaigning
David Ciciline and Kevin McKenna launched their campaigns prior to the June conviction of incumbent mayor Buddy Cianci, and criticized the disgraced mayor. Paolino and Igliozzi launched their candidacies after Cianci's conviction, and did not openly criticize Cianci. Igliozzi had once worked in the city's solicitor's office during Cianci's mayoralty.

Paloino pledged to revitalize blighted areas of the city by cleaning up their parks and schools, and by increasing community police officers.

Ciciline also advocated for the arts, and proposed making gallery and studio space available to more residents.

While Ciciline was openly gay, Paolino sought to challenge him for support of the city's gay voters.

Results

General election

Candidates 
David Cicilline (Democrat), member of the Rhode Island House of Representatives since 1995
Greg Gerritt (Green)
David Talin (Republican)
Christopher Young (independent)

Withdrew
Pat Cortelessa (independent)
Robert Farrow (independent)

Campaigning
It was anticipated that the winner of the Democratic Party primary would be the races frontrunner in the strongly Democratic city's mayoral race.

The sexuality of Cecilline, vying to become the city's first openly homosexual mayor, was not a prominent issue in the campaign. Some in the gay community even criticized Cecilline, accusing him of downplaying his sexuality in order to appeal more broadly to voters.

Polls
Throughout the campaign, Cecilline was a strong leader in polls.

Results

2006
 

The 2006 Providence, Rhode Island mayoral election was held on November 7, 2006. It saw the reelection of incumbent Democrat David Cicilline.

Democratic primary
The Democratic Party's primary election was held on September 12, 2006.

Candidates
David Cicilline, incumbent mayor since 2003
Christopher F. Young, perennial candidate (including as the Reform nominee for United States Senate in 2000 and as a candidate for mayor in 2002)

Results

General election
Cicilline faced Republican nominee Daniel S. Harrop III, who had previously run for state house in 2002 as a Libertarian and in 2004 as a Republican.

2010
 

The 2010 Providence, Rhode Island mayoral election was held on November 2, 2010. The election saw the election of Angel Taveras.

Taveras became the first Hispanic mayor of the city and the third elected and fourth serving Dominican-American mayor in the United States.

Incumbent David Cicilline did not seek reelection, instead opting to run in the coinciding election for Rhode Island's 1st congressional district. Cicilline was eligible to seek reelection to a third consecutive term as mayor, as term limits passed in 2006 (which limited mayors to two consecutive terms) would not go into effect until the following year.

Democratic primary

Results

General election

Results

2014

The 2014 Providence, Rhode Island mayoral election was held on November 4, 2014. The election saw the election of Jorge Elorza.

Incumbent Angel Taveras did not seek reelection, and instead (unsuccessfully) sought the Democratic nomination in the coinciding Rhode Island gubernatorial election.

Democratic primary
The Democratic primary was held on September 9, 2014.

Results
Despite still appearing on the ballot, Brett Smiley had withdrawn and endorsed Elorza before the primary was held.

General election
The election pinned Democratic primary winner Jorge Elorza against former mayor Buddy Cianci, who was running as an independent, and Republican Daniel S. Harrop.

Elorza was endorsed by United States President Barack Obama.

On July 14, 2014, businessman Lorne Adrian withdrew his independent candidacy.

Independent candidate Jeffrey E. Lemire failed to get his name on the ballot.

Results

2018

 

The 2018 Providence, Rhode Island mayoral election was held on November 6, 2018. The election saw the reelection of Jorge Elorza.

Democratic primary
On September 12, 2018, incumbent mayor Jorge Elorza won renomination by the Democratic Party, defeating challengers Kobi Dennis and Robert DeRobbio.

Elorza had been endorsed by the party organization ahead of the primary.

Polls

Results

General election

Results

2022
 

The 2022 Providence, Rhode Island mayoral election was held on November 8, 2022.

Since Providence limits mayors to two consecutive terms, incumbent mayor Jorge Elorza, a Democrat, was term-limited  and thus could not run for reelection to a third consecutive term in office.

Democratic primary

Candidates

Nominee
Brett Smiley, former Rhode Island director of administration and 2014 mayoral candidate

Eliminated in primary
Gonzalo Cuervo, former deputy secretary of state and former chief of staff to Secretary of State of Rhode Island Nellie Gorbea
Nirva LaFortune, Providence city councilor

Withdrew
Michael Solomon, former Providence City Council president and 2014 mayoral candidate (endorsed Smiley)

Declined
Lorne Adrian, businessman and 2014 independent mayoral candidate
Dylan Conley, candidate for United States House of Representatives  in 2020
Kobi Dennis, community activist and 2018 mayoral candidate
Grace Diaz, Rhode Island state representative (endorsed Cuervo)
Raymond Hull, Rhode Island state representative
John Igliozzi, Providence City Council president
John J. Lombardi, Rhode Island state representative, former acting mayor, and 2010 mayoral candidate
David Salvatore, city councilor

Endorsements

Results

External links
Official campaign websites
 Gonzalo Cuervo (D) for Mayor
 Nirva LaFortune (D) for Mayor
 Brett Smiley (D) for Mayor

General election

Results

References